The Sessions may refer to:

 The Sessions (2012 film), a film by Ben Lewin
 The Sessions (2020 film), a Nigerian romantic drama film
 The Sessions (album), an album by The Stranglers
 The Sessions (band), a Canadian band

See also
 The Sessions Band, an American musical group
 Sessions (disambiguation)